Friedrich Wilhelm Schindler (June 1, 1856 – November 19, 1920) was Swiss Austrian pioneer of electrical engineering. He is notable for building Austria's first electric generator, introducing a fully electric kitchen at the 1893 Chicago World Fair, and patenting an early form of the electronic cigarette lighter.

References

1856 births
1920 deaths
20th-century Swiss inventors
19th-century Swiss inventors